Kensington Park School is a coeducational private day and boarding school located in London, England.

The lower school for pupils aged 11 to 16 is situated in the Bayswater area of the City of Westminster, while the sixth form is located in nearby South Kensington. in 2020 Chelsea Independent College in Fulham formally merged with Kensington Park School.

References

External links
Kensington Park School official website

Private co-educational schools in London
Private schools in the City of Westminster
Boarding schools in London